Prioro is a municipality located in the province of León, Castile and León, Spain. According to the 2016 census (INE), the municipality has a population of 369 inhabitants. The municipality is composed by two villages, one of them being Prioro, the main one. The other one is Tejerina, which is located seven km away.

References

Municipalities in the Province of León